Patrick Barrett (died 1415) was an Irish bishop.

Patrick Barrett may also refer to:

 Paddy Barrett (born 1993), Irish footballer
 Pat Barrett (musician) (born 1984), American contemporary worship musician
 Pat Barrett (album), 2018
 Pat Barrett (wrestler) (born 1941), Irish wrestler
 Pat Barrett (boxer) (born 1967), British boxer
 Tony Rebel (Patrick George Anthony Barrett, born 1962), Jamaican musician

See also
 John Patrick Barrett (1878–1946), British clergyman